Ephraim Lewis (27 November 1967 – 18 March 1994) was an English soul/neo-soul and R&B singer and songwriter. He died after falling from a balcony after being tasered during a police pursuit, with only one album to his name.

Death 

On 18 March 1994, Los Angeles Police Department (LAPD) responded to reports of a "naked black man acting crazy" at 1710 Fuller Avenue, the apartment where Lewis was living. They reported that Lewis had tried to escape the officers, and began climbing the outside balconies. When he reached the top floor there was an altercation. While on the top balcony, the police had used a taser on Lewis three times. Police claimed this had "no apparent effect", although according to reports it was applied directly to Lewis's skin. Lewis fell from the balcony and landed on the courtyard below, suffering extensive head injuries.

After being kept alive on a ventilator for several hours, the decision was made to end life-sustaining measures, acting on the advice of the hospital. Lewis died at the hospital that night. The coroner assigned by the LAPD ruled the death as a suicide. It took a month for his body to be returned to the UK. The following month, hundreds of people gathered at the Darlington Street Methodist Church in Wolverhampton for his funeral. His manager, David Harper, covered most of the funeral expenses and the cost of returning Lewis's body to England, but did not attend the service. Lewis was laid to rest on 21 April 1994.

Naomi Hobbs, Lewis's cousin, who is a barrister, said:

Kevin Bacon, whose Axis Studio discovered Lewis, said:

Naomi Hobbs challenged the Police department's account of events. An investigation was not carried out.

Discography

Album

References

External links
 

1967 births
1994 deaths
English male singer-songwriters
English soul musicians
British contemporary R&B singers
Neo soul singers
People from Wolverhampton
20th-century Black British male singers
20th-century English male writers
Deaths from falls